Gerard A. "Jigger" Phalen (March 28, 1934 – October 25, 2021) was a former Canadian Senator, educator, and union leader.

Early life
Phalen was from Glace Bay, Nova Scotia He was an industrial mechanical instructor at the Nova Scotia Eastern Institute of Technology  and then at the University College of Cape Breton (now Cape Breton University) until his retirement in 1991. Active in the Nova Scotia Government Employees Union, he served as its president from 1976 to 1979. He has also served as chairman of the faculty association at NSEIT and in various other academic capacities at UCCB.

Political career
He was appointed to the Canadian Senate by Prime Minister Jean Chrétien in 2001 and sat in the upper house as a Liberal. He left the Senate upon reaching the mandatory retirement age of 75 on March 28, 2009.

Personal life
Phalen and his wife Christina Phalen had three children.

References

External links
 

1934 births
2021 deaths
Canadian senators from Nova Scotia
Liberal Party of Canada senators
21st-century Canadian politicians
People from Glace Bay